Empress Fu (傅皇后) (died September or October 1 BC), formally Empress Xiao'ai (孝哀皇后), was an Empress during Han Dynasty. Her personal name is unknown. Her husband was Emperor Ai of Han, but they had no children, and their marriage was possibly not even consummated because he was homosexual.

Life 

Empress Fu was a daughter of her husband’s grandmother Consort Fu’s cousin Fu Yan (傅晏). She became his consort when he was still the Prince of Dingtao and later crown prince. After the death of his uncle Emperor Cheng in April 7 BC, he ascended the throne as Emperor Ai, and she was created his empress that same year on 16 June. Her father was created the Marquess of Kongxiang.

By the time Emperor Ai died in August 1 BC, Empress Fu’s main support, Consort Fu, had already been dead for many months, and she suddenly was all alone as her father and her other relatives were purged from government by Wang Mang. Wang, who bore grudges against Fu and Ai, did not permit her to become empress dowager, and a brief time after Ai’s death, he had her demoted to commoner status and ordered her to guard her husband’s tomb—even though she was not personally involved in any of the political intrigue. She committed suicide that day.

References 

1st-century BC births
1 BC deaths
Han dynasty empresses
1st-century BC Chinese women
1st-century BC Chinese people
Suicides in the Han dynasty